The Prix Révélation (Prize of Revelation or Debut Prize) is one of the prizes awarded by the Angoulême International Comics Festival. This prize honors cartoonists who are early in their career.

Some version of the prize has been awarded almost every year since the first festival in 1974. At first it was called the Prize of Best Hope (prix du meilleur espoir), then in 1985 it was reborn as the Prize for Best First Album (prix du meilleur premier album). In 1989, as the whole award ceremony was renamed after Hergé's unfinished book Alph-Art, this prize became the Alph-Art coup de cœur and was awarded to authors with up to three published works. From 2003-2006 the award was again called Best First Album (meilleur premier album), then in 2007 was renamed the Prix Révélation, which is still its name as of 2018.

1970s
1974: Alfredo Chiappori
1975: Annie Goetzinger
1976: 
1977: 
1979: Goudard t.1: Dossier Goudard by Jean-Pierre Gibrat & Jackie Berroyer (Éditions du Square)

1980s
1981: La Vie d'Einstein by Daniel Goossens (AUDIE)
1985:  by Baru (Dargaud)
1988: Le soleil des loups by Arthur Qwak and Gilles Gonnort (Vents d’Ouest)
1989:  by Dupuy and Berberian (AUDIE)

1990s
1992: Trio Grande, t.1: Adios, Palomita by Fabrice Lamy, and Alain Clément (Delcourt)
1994: Slaloms part 1 by Lewis Trondheim (L'Association)
1997: Journal part 1 by Fabrice Neaud (Ego comme X)
1999: Quelques jours d’été by Christophe Chabouté (Paquet)

2000s
2000:  by Christophe Blain (Dupuis)
2001: Persépolis by Marjane Satrapi (L’Association)
Blacksad: Quelque part parmi les ombres by Juan Díaz Canales and Juanjo Guarnido (Dargaud)
Shenzhen by Guy Delisle (L’Association)
2002: Le val des ânes by 
Bouffe et châtiment by Mathias Gnehm and Francis Rivolta
Norbert l'Imaginaire : Imaginaire: 1 / Raison: 0 by Olivier Guéret and Nicolas Vadot
Samedi et Dimanche: Le paradis des cailloux by Gwen and Fabien Vehlmann
2003: L'âge de raison by 
 by Jason
Sainte famille by 
Supermurgeman: Joue et gagne! by Mathsap
Hector Umbra: Folie semi-automatique by 
Ludologie by Ludovic Debeurme
Palaces by Simon Hureau
 by Charles Masson
La tendresse des crocodiles by 
2005: De Mal En Pis by Alex Robinson (Rackham)
Blankets - Manteau de neige by Craig Thompson (Casterman)
L’immeuble d’en face by Vanyda (La Boîte à Bulles)
Love My Life by Ebine Yamaji (Asuka)
Same difference by Derek Kirk Kim (6 Pieds sous Terre)
Le blog de Frantico by Frantico (Albin Michel)
Cornigule by Takashi Kurihara (Cornélius)
Kinki et Cosy part 1 by Nix (Le Lombard)
The Goon: Rien que de la misère by Eric Powell (Delcourt)
2007: Panier de singe by Florent Ruppert & Jérôme Mulot (L'Association)
2009: Le Goût du chlore (A Taste of Chlorine) by Bastien Vivès (Casterman)

2010s
2010: , t.3: Au hasard Balthazar!  (Actes Sud BD)
2011 (tie):  by Ulli Lust (Çà et là)
2013: Automne by Jon McNaught (Nobrow)
2014 (tie): Le Livre de Léviathan by Peter Blegvad (L'Apocalypse)
2014 (tie): Mon ami Dahmer by Derf Backderf (Ça et là)
2015: Yékini, le roi des arènes by  &  (FLBLB)
2018: Beverly by Nick Drnaso (Presque lune)
2019: Ted drôle de coco by Émilie Gleason

2020s
 2020: Lucarne by Joe Kessler (L'Association)
2022: La vie souterraine by Camille Lavaud Benito (Les Requins Marteaux)

References

External link
ToutenBD List of winners of all awards per year

Angoulême International Comics Festival